Philip Tingay (born 2 May 1950) is an English former professional footballer who played in the Football League, as a goalkeeper.

References

Sources

1950 births
Living people
Footballers from Chesterfield
English footballers
Association football goalkeepers
Chesterfield F.C. players
Barnsley F.C. players
Kettering Town F.C. players
Alfreton Town F.C. players
Buxton F.C. players
Gainsborough Trinity F.C. players
English Football League players
National League (English football) players
Gainsborough Trinity F.C. managers
English football managers